Malcolm Eric Trudgen   (born 1951) is a West Australian botanist.
He has published some 105 botanical names.   He currently runs his own consulting company, ME Trudgen and Associates.

He has worked in the Pilbara.

Some publications

.

Honours 
A daisy, Pilbara trudgenii, which he and  Colma Keating discovered in 1985 east of Paraburdoo in the  Hamersley Range and which has been named in his honour. 
Micromyrtus trudgenii, a Myrtaceae species, 
a wattle, Acacia trudgeniana (Trudgen's wattle) and 
a trigger plant,  Stylidium trudgenii, also honour Trudgen, because it was he who drew attention the existence of these plants.

Some published names 

 Aluta Rye & Trudgen, Nuytsia 13(2): 347 (2000). 
 Angasomyrtus Trudgen & Keighery, Nuytsia 4(3): 435 (1983). (not accepted, synonymous with Kunzea)
 Astartea granitica Rye & Trudgen, Nuytsia 23: 239 (2013).
 Astus Trudgen & Rye, Nuytsia 15(3): 502 (498-503) (2005).
 Enekbatus Trudgen & Rye, Nuytsia 20: 241 (-242) (2010).
 Ochrosperma Trudgen, Nuytsia 6(1): 11 (1987).
 Seorsus Rye & Trudgen, Nuytsia 18: 248 (-249) (2008).

See also
:Category:Taxa named by Malcolm Eric Trudgen

References

Living people
1951 births
20th-century Australian botanists
21st-century Australian botanists